Ras Gobena Dache (1821 – July 1889) was a military commander during Menelik II's reign. He is known for campaigning against Oromo territory to incorporate more lands into the Ethiopian Empire in the late 19th century.

History

Gobena's son Wedajo was married to Menelik's daughter Shoarega who bore him, a grandson, Wasan Seged Wedajo, whom Menelik saw as his successor, and had him raised at the court as if heir to the throne. Wedajo opposed the court education of his son and this dispute over child custody led to the divorce of his wife. This grandson of Menelik II was eliminated from the succession due to dwarfism.

Southern expansion

Ras Gobena (earlier Dejazmach Gobena) became a famed chief who was close to the Aba Mudda, a spiritual head of the Oromo. He gained support among various Oromo clans, and he led the western and southern military movement of Menelik II. According to historian Donald Levine, Ras Gobena did most of the southern expansion that incorporated more Oromo speaking peoples into Menelik's Ethiopian Empire, helped by Oromo soldiers that were led by various famous Oromo chiefs like Moroda Bekere. In addition to Oromo communities, Ras Gobena defeated the militias of southern ethnic Sidama and Kebena communities. Near the end of his life in the 1880s, the Shewan army governed by Ras Gobena defeated the forces of the Muslim Kebena leader Hassen Injamo. On 14 October 1888, the allied forces of Ras Gobena and Moroda Bekere defeated the Mahdist Sudanese invasion of the Welega Oromo at the Battle of Guté Dili.

Some of the southern communities militarily opposed Ras Gobana's army throughout his campaigns, while others, particularly the kingdoms in the Gibe region, embraced the alliance with Ras Gobena and Menelik II, who later became the Emperor of Ethiopia. Despite the opposition, historian Dr. Donald Levine states that some southern Oromo supported Ras Gobana and the Ethiopian centralization was "welcomed as a way to put an end" to "intertribal fighting" between the Oromo communities. During the conquest of southern territories, Menelik's Army carried out mass atrocities against his opponents in battle including mutilation, killings and large scale slavery.

The two most important historical figures who signify the introduction of the concepts of national boundary and sovereignty in Ethiopia are Emperor Menelik II and Ras Gobana Dache, who used guns manufactured in Europe to bring a large swath of Biyas (regions/nations) under a centralized rule.

Popular culture
The sentiment of most Ethiopians toward Ras Gobana often correlates to 21st century Ethiopian politics. Ras Gobana is a controversial figure for some Oromo nationalists who think he was a traitor for allying with the Northern Ethiopians to conquer some southern regions. Mohammed Hassan translates the following song as an example of Oromo expression that Gobana betrayed his own people:

Though many Oromo communities battled and conquered each other for centuries, some contemporary Oromo politicians who favor ethno-political mobilization toward Oromo unity often associate Oromo opposition to them as a betrayal act similar to that of the 19th century Ras Gobana and other Oromo leaders who allied with the Amhara and Tigray. And those Oromos who associated with Ethiopian governments of the past, including Derg and the Selassie Monarch are sometimes labeled "neo-Goobanaas." In contrast, other Ethiopians who advocate Ethiopian unity and who oppose ethnocentric political movements often glorify Ras Gobana as an Ethiopian hero and as a unifying figure.

References

1821 births
1889 deaths
19th-century Ethiopian people